Barry Westwood (7 September 1927 – 3 July 2011) was an English presenter and producer at ITV franchise Southern Television from 1959 until 1981. For most of that time, he was the front-man of Day by Day, the station's evening news magazine, notable for its on-screen harmonious camaraderie.

Other notable series include; The Race Apart, Afloat and The Barry Westwood Talkabout.

Known affectionately as "Mr Southern Television", he retired and up until his death resided in Buckinghamshire.

He died in hospital on 13 July 2011 at the age 83.

See also
Southern Television

References

1927 births
2011 deaths
English television presenters